Woman Against the World is a 1937 American melodrama film directed by David Selman and starring Alice Moore, Edgar Edwards, and Ralph Masters. The screenplay was written by Edgar Edwards. The film was released on May 6, 1937.

Cast list
 Alice Moore as Anna Masters
 Edgar Edwards as Johnny Masters
 Ralph Forbes as Larry Steele
 Collette Lyons as Patsy
 Sylvia Welsh as Betty Jane
 Ethel Reese-Burns as Aunt Frieda Plummer
 George Hallett as Mr. Plummer
 James McGrath as Detective James P. Flavin
 Grant MacDonald as Jimmy Daley
 Fred Bass as Prosecutor
 Harry Hay as Mr. Martin
 Enid Cole as Mrs. Martin
 Reginald Hincks as The judge

References

External links
 
 
 

Columbia Pictures films
Films directed by David Selman
Melodrama films
1937 drama films
1937 films
American drama films
American black-and-white films
1930s English-language films
1930s American films